CUTC may refer to:

 Canterbury University Tramping Club, the Canterbury University tramping club based in Christchurch, New Zealand
 Canadian Undergraduate Technology Conference
 Charles Urban Trading Company
 Copper(I)-thiophene-2-carboxylate (CuTC), a reagent used in organic chemistry
 CUTC (gene), a gene that encodes copper homeostasis protein cutC homolog